Lincoln Brewster (born July 30, 1971) is an American contemporary Christian musician and worship pastor. As a guitarist, singer, and songwriter, Brewster became a sought-after session guitarist in the early 90s. Brewster is the former senior worship pastor at Bayside Church in Granite Bay, California.

Biography

Brewster has been musically inclined since his early childhood in Homer, Alaska. At the age of one, his mother, Cheryl, noticed how well he could keep rhythm on a drum set his grandfather had given him. At the age of five, his mother introduced him to the mandolin. Quickly mastering the instrument, he began playing for cruise ship tourists alongside his mother in Homer. Brewster's step brothers include John and Andy Hillstrand from the Discovery channel TV show Deadliest Catch.

By the age of 12, Brewster had a band called Lincoln and the Missing Links, which included his mother on bass and vocals. In his late teens, he moved with his family to Modesto, California, where he attended Grace M. Davis High School and joined the high school jazz band (playing guitar and drums) and marching band (playing snare drum).

Due to connections gained in Los Angeles, he had recording contract offers by 19. Feeling an emptiness in his life, Brewster attended church services with his high school sweetheart, Laura. He recalls feeling God drawing him close after attending a drama ministry performance with Laura. "I was afraid to lay down a lot of things in my life," Brewster said. "One night, I laid all my cards on the table. I asked the Lord to come into my life, all by myself. It was the best night of sleep I'd ever had. I was very peaceful. I think that was what enabled me to blow off that record deal."

After receiving a call from Steve Perry inviting him to audition as lead guitarist for his solo project For the Love of Strange Medicine, Brewster accepted and began songwriting and rehearsals for the album. Brewster's guitar technique, tone, and equipment choices possessed similar qualities and texturing to Journey's Neal Schon, and was touted as a favorable feature in the resulting album. He was then married to Laura and soon after toured with Perry for six months from 1994 to early 1995.

At the end of the tour, Brewster moved back to Modesto, California to be with his wife where they attended Calvary Temple Church. After working as a sound technician for the church for a while, the senior pastor offered Brewster the position of associate music director and youth worship leader.

In 1997, the Brewsters left California and moved to Nashville to serve as youth pastors and eventually as full-time music ministers at The Oasis Church. It was there that Brewster met with executives from Integrity Incorporated who were there to work on a new Hosanna! Music album. After seeing his talent on the guitar, one executive listened to a demo project Brewster had produced. Already impressed with the production work and artistry, the executive also learned that Brewster had played every instrument and performed all the vocals himself. In 2001, Brewster moved back to California to become the worship pastor at Bayside Church in Sacramento.

Brewster was signed to Integrity's Vertical Music label with whom he has released five full-length albums .

While working on his own self-titled album (with producer Paul Mills), Brewster worked with label-mate Darrell Evans, contributing vocals, guitar and co-writing on Evans' Freedom project. He also spent some time on the road, touring with Michael W. Smith during Smith's 1998 Live the Life tour. Brewster's second album, Live to Worship (produced by Jeff Quimby and co-produced by Brewster), was released in 2000. According to his biography in his official website, "Lincoln now combines his talents and determination to record songs that will minister to a new generation of believers."

Brewster's album, Today Is the Day, was released on September 23, 2008. The album's first released single, was the title track "Today Is the Day".

On September 22, 2009, Brewster released a deluxe edition of Today Is the Day consisting of a CD with same songs as Today Is the Day as well as a and DVD containing two music videos, a few song stories and a part of his instructional video.

Brewster released his latest project, Real Life, on September 28, 2010. The record is packed full of upbeat, contemporary worship tracks such as "Best Days" and the optimistic "Reaching For You". It also includes contemplative radio-ready songs such as the title track "Real Life", and the rhythmic "Whom Shall I Fear".

In 2012, Brewster released his first Christmas album, Joy to the World. A deluxe edition was released on November 5, 2013, with seven new tracks and an additional DVD.
In 2014 Brewster released Oxygen, his ninth studio album after signing with Integrity Music after 15 years. He called the album a "new sound", which explained the album's high sense of modern pop music with of course a lot of guitar riffs and solos.

In 2015, Lincoln Brewster released his first rendition of "The Star-Spangled Banner" as a surprise on the USA's Independence Day holiday. He was a part of the Winter Jam Tour 2015 West Coast.

His most recent releases include God of the Impossible in 2018, A Mostly Acoustic Christmas in 2019, and Perfect Love in 2021.

Equipment
Brewster primarily uses two different 57 reissue Fender Stratocasters with DiMarzio pickups, one with Aztec Gold finish on an ash body, the other on a three-color sunburst finish with an Alder body, both with maple fingerboards and necks. Fender released his Artist signature model Stratocaster in August 2019.

Brewster achieves his live tone solely from a Line 6 POD HD500 unit. He occasionally uses a provided amp for stage noise only and goes direct to the PA system with the floor POD.

Brewster also uses a Kemper profiling amplifier live and in his home studio.  He recently stated in a live Facebook video that he recorded "No One Like Our God (One Take)" on the Line 6 Helix Native program directly from his guitar.

Discography

Studio albums

Live albums

Compilation albums

Singles

Compilations

Collaborations

References

Resources
 Lincoln Brewster Official Website biography
 Vertical Music profile for Lincoln Brewster

External links
 
 Vertical Music profile
 Lincoln Brewster's profile & Images at NewReleaseTuesday.com

1971 births
20th-century American singers
21st-century American singers
American performers of Christian music
Christian music songwriters
Performers of contemporary worship music
Living people
Singers from Alaska
People from Fairbanks, Alaska
People from Homer, Alaska
Musicians from Modesto, California
People from Roseville, California
Songwriters from Alaska
Singers from California
20th-century American guitarists
21st-century American guitarists
People from Granite Bay, California
Guitarists from Alaska
Guitarists from California